James Franklin Wong (born March 28, 1987) is an American actor and musician. He is best known for his 2011 music video, "Ching Chong: Asians in the Library Song" and for his role as Ted in the web series Video Game High School. In 2017, he and YouTuber Meghan Camarena co-hosted the video game themed variety show Polaris Primetime, which was created as part of Disney's "DXP" programming block on Disney XD.

Wong has appeared in feature films such as John Dies at the End, The Circle, and the live-action version of Mulan.

Early life 
Wong grew up in Normandy Park, Washington. He graduated from Middlebury College in 2009, where he majored in theater and drama. After graduating, he moved to Los Angeles to become an actor.

Career 
Wong garnered national news coverage in March 2011, when he uploaded his music video, "Ching Chong: Asians in the Library Song" to YouTube. He created the video as a response to a UCLA student's vlog rant against Asian students using mobile phones in the UCLA library, one which MSNBC qualified as "offensive." NPR suggested that Wong's video response was one that "effectively turn[ed] the tables on the original rant," offering an alternative method of defense against cyberbullying. Wong later said in an MSNBC interview that while he was initially frustrated by the video rant, he realized that humor offered a better response, as he hoped to "put a positive spin on all of it." Furthermore, he stated, an eye for an eye approach would only encourage "this behavior to continue." "Ching Chong: Asians in the Library Song" went viral and was covered nationally by the American media.

That same year, he co-launched and co-host the YouTube cooking show Feast of Fiction with Ashley Adams.

Wong later portrayed Ted in the web series Video Game High School. He was also invited by Lionsgate and Google to create the web series District Voices. In 2014, Wong was ranked #73 on New Media Rockstars Top 100 Channels.

Wong played Ling in Disney's 2020 live action remake of the 1998 Mulan animated movie.

Gaming 
Wong is an avid player of Magic: The Gathering, specifically the Commander format. He hosts a podcast with co-host Josh Lee Kwai called The Command Zone, where he and Josh discuss their experiences playing the Commander format. Wong is referred to by his co-host as "Jimmy the Red" due to the fact that he often plays red decks when playing commander. He has also been called upon by Wizards of the Coast to preview new sets at exhibitions and on their YouTube channel. He also was on the podcast Dungeons & Daddies (a D&D podcast), for a short time, were he played a demonic human-paladin character named: Jodie Foster.

Personal life 
His father is Chinese, from Canton, and his mother is of Chinese and Mongol ancestry. He is the younger brother of filmmaker Freddie Wong.

Partial filmography

Awards
2015: Won: International Academy of Web Television Awards – Best Ensemble Performance/Comedy, Video Game High School (shared with other cast members)
2014: Won: Streamy Awards – Best Action or Sci-Fi Series, Video Game High School (shared with cast and crew members)
2014: Won: Streamy Awards – Best Ensemble Cast, Video Game High School (shared with other cast members)
2017: Won: Guinness World Records - Most videogame characters identified in one minute

References

External links 

Living people
American male film actors
American musicians of Chinese descent
American male actors of Chinese descent
American people of Mongolian descent
American YouTubers
Place of birth missing (living people)
Musicians from Seattle
Middlebury College alumni
Male actors from Seattle
Nonviolence advocates
Gaming YouTubers
Let's Players
21st-century American male actors
1987 births
Singers from Washington (state)
21st-century American singers
21st-century American male singers